Kiyonobu Suzuki may refer to:

, Japanese World War II flying ace
, Japanese voice actor